Karenaxia is a genus of beetles in the family Buprestidae, containing the following species:

 Karenaxia horaki Bily, 1993
 Karenaxia nigrocyanea Bily, 1997
 Karenaxia similis Bily, 1999

References

Buprestidae genera